Geheimakten Solvay is an East German film. It was released in 1953, and sold more than 3,800,000 tickets.

Cast
 Wilhelm Koch-Hooge: Hannes Lorenz
 Leny Marenbach: Bertha Lorenz
 Ulrich Thein: Fritz Lorenz
 Rudolf Klix: Hauptbuchhalter Treusch
 Johannes Arpe: Walter Schramm
 Sigrid Roth: Gerda Schramm
 Harald Mannl: Direktor Lütgen
 Raimund Schelcher: Mertens
 Gertrud Meyen: Elisabeth Bergen
 Peter Herden: Max Wredel
 Paul R. Henker: Ofenmeister Schaub
 Kurt Wildersinn: Lau
 Alexander Hunzinger: Krumme
 Carl Balhaus: Rudi
 Rudolf Fleck: Paul
 Theo Shall: Director Menneke

References

External links
 

1953 films
East German films
1950s German-language films
German black-and-white films
1950s German films